The California Rifle & Pistol Association (CRPA) is an 501(c)(4) advocacy group that provides training in the safe use of firearms; sanctions shooting competitions and lobbies for pro-firearms and Second Amendment policy in the US state of California. The CRPA is controlled by an independent board of directors in California. The Association has engaged in litigation challenging anti-gun legislation.

Subsidiaries
The CRPA Foundation is the 501c3 segment of the CRPA family. The CRPA Foundation provides grants and scholarships to deserving groups and students who are involved in the shooting sports and conservation. The CRPA Foundation is a tax-exempt entity and most donations to the Foundation are non-taxable. The Foundation is a 501(c)(3) organization.

The Association's political activities are coordinated through the political action committee, CRPA-PAC which is a separate corporation. The Association employs a full-time lobbyist in the California state capital Sacramento

References

External Links
 
 

501(c)(4) nonprofit organizations
Civil liberties advocacy groups in the United States
Firearms-related organizations
Gun rights advocacy groups in the United States
Lobbying organizations in the United States
Magazine publishing companies of the United States
Shooting sports in the United States
Shooting sports organizations
Organizations established in 1875